The Chief Minister of Khyber Pakhtunkhwa is the head of government of the Pakistani province of Khyber Pakhtunkhwa. The chief minister leads the legislative branch of the provincial government, and is elected by the Provincial Assembly. Given that he has the confidence of the assembly, the chief minister's term is for five years and is subject to no term limits. Azam Khan is the current caretaker chief minister of Khyber Pakhtunkhwa.

The Chief Minister of Khyber Pakhtunkhwa is elected by the Provincial Assembly of Khyber Pakhtunkhwa to serve as the head of the provincial government in Khyber-Pakhtunkhwa, Pakistan.

History
In 1901, NWFP was declared as a Chief Commissioner Province and thirty-one years later in 1932 its status was raised to the Governor Province and NWFP Legislative Council was formed. The first session of the council was summoned on 18 May 1932 under the presidentship of His Lordship Hon'ble K.B. Khan Abdul Ghafoor Khan, Khan of Zaida at the Town Hall Abbotabad, at 9 a.m. of the clock, swearing Sir Sahibzada Abdul Qayyum as the minister for Transferred Departments.
In 1937, the Government of India Act 1935 was enforced in NWFP changing the pre set regulations which introduced the portfolio of the chief minister, abolishing the portfolio of the president. The first session of the new parliament was summoned on 12 March 1946 under the Chairmanship of Sardar Bahadur Khan while Nawabzada Allah Nawaz Khan was elected as Speaker and Lala Girdheri Lal as Deputy Speaker on 13 March 1946. The total number of members was 50. This Assembly was dissolved in 1951 and the number of members was increased from 50 to 58. The legislative Assembly became a Provincial Assembly through a presidential order known as legal framework order 1970. After the restoration of the Provincial Assembly in 1970, General Elections were held for the NWFP Provincial Assembly on 17 December 1970. At that time the number of member’s seats in the Assembly was 43 out of which 2 seats were reserved for women and only one for minorities. The first session of the Assembly was summoned on 2 May 1972 in the hall of Pakistan Academy for Rural Development, University Town Peshawar. Mr. Muhammad Aslam Khan Khattak was elected as Speaker and Arbab Saifur Rehman Khan as Deputy

List of Chief Ministers

See also 
 Government of Pakistan 
 Prime Minister of Pakistan 
 Government of Khyber Pakhtunkhwa 
 Governor of Khyber Pakhtunkhwa
 Chief Secretary Khyber Pakhtunkhwa
 List of Chief Ministers of Khyber Pakhtunkhwa
 List of Chief Ministers in Pakistan
 List of Governors of Pakistan
 Chief Minister of Punjab
 Chief Minister of Balochistan 
 Chief Minister of Sindh 
 Chief Minister of Gilgit-Baltistan
 Prime Minister of Azad Jammu and Kashmir

References
Functions Of Chief Minister’s Secretariat - khyberpakhtunkhwa.gov.pk/

External links
 Chief Minister's Website

Khyber Pakhtunkhwa
 
North-West Frontier Province